The Kennesaw State Owls women's basketball team represents Kennesaw State University in the sport of College basketball. They are a mid-major team in the NCAA Division I, and compete in the ASUN Conference. The Owls host their opponents at the KSU Convocation Center, nearby to their Kennesaw Campus. They are coached by Octavia Blue.

History
The Owls began play in 1982. They played in the National Association of Intercollegiate Athletics and Georgia Intercollegiate Athletics Conference from 1982 to 1994. In their time in the NAIA, they made the NAIA playoffs seven times while compiling an all-time record of 204–143. They transitioned from NAIA to Division II from 1992 to 1994. In their time in Division II, they made the Elite Eight in 1997 and 1999 along with an appearance in the second round in 2000, with an all-time record of 222–98. They were formerly a member of the Peach Belt Conference from 1994 to 2005. They joined Division I in 2005. As of the end of the 2015–16 season, they have an all-time record of 550–442, with a record of 123–201 in Division I play.

In 2014–15, the Owls had their most wins in their Division I program history, at 17. The Owls had a strong season behind their senior point guard, Kristina Wells.

Division I era records
The Owls have been competing in Division I since the 2005–06 season.

Postseason

NCAA Division II
The Owls made three appearances in the NCAA Division II women's basketball tournament. They had a combined record of 6–3.

NAIA Division I
The Owls made the NAIA Division I women's basketball tournament two times, with a combined record of 1–2.

References

External links